Anton Malyshev (born February 24, 1985) is a Russian professional ice hockey player. He is currently playing with VMF Karelia of the Supreme Hockey League (VHL).

Malyshev made his Kontinental Hockey League debut playing with Avangard Omsk during the inaugural 2008–09 KHL season.

References

External links

1985 births
Living people
Amur Khabarovsk players
Avangard Omsk players
HC Sibir Novosibirsk players
Russian ice hockey forwards
SKA Saint Petersburg players